South Korea, as Republic of Korea, competed at the 1988 Winter Olympics in Calgary, Alberta, Canada.

Competitors
The following is the list of number of competitors in the Games.

Alpine skiing

Men

Biathlon

Men

Cross-country skiing

Men

Figure skating

Men

Women

Speed skating

Men

Women

Short track speed skating (Demonstration sport)

Men

Women

References

Official Olympic Reports

Korea, South
1988
O